Grove Township is a township in Shelby County, Iowa. There are a small 51 people and 1.4 people per square mile in Grove Township. The total area is 35.9 square miles.

References

Townships in Shelby County, Iowa
Townships in Iowa